The Littlest Groom is an American reality television special broadcast by the Fox Broadcasting Company (Fox). The two-part special premiered on February 16, 2004, and concluded on February 23, 2004. The special followed Glen Foster, a 23-year-old little person, in search of love among a group of 12 women. Similar to Foster, the women were all little people; Foster narrowed the women down through a series of one-on-one dates and group activities. After eliminating several of the women from the competition, Foster's dating pool was expanded to include several average-height women. At the end of the special, Foster was required to make a choice over who he felt most compatible with between the remaining two women in the competition. The special was hosted by English television presenter Dani Behr.

The Littlest Groom was a part of Fox's intent to capitalize on a rising interest in little people-themed reality television shows. The special, however, was met with negative reception from television critics, who generally deemed the special to be exploitative of little people. Conversely, advocacy groups, such as Little People of America, praised the special for promoting a positive portrayal of little people. The Littlest Groom averaged 9.9 million viewers for the two parts of the special, which was modest for the network. Since its conclusion, Fox has expressed interest in making a sequel to the special.

Reception
The show was subjected to considerable negative criticism from media critics and the general public, due to its purportedly exploitative “latter-day freak show” dimension or “carnival-like” quality. Nonetheless, at least one of the little women who appeared on the show explicitly rejected this interpretation, as did Foster himself.

Similarly, Matt Roloff, then-president of the advocacy group Little People of America, commented on the potential for The Littlest Groom to provide a positive media representation of little people as individuals “just being themselves". “[H]iding us behind closed doors or in funny costumes”, he observed, “will never give us the exposure needed to desensitize society to us”.

See also

 Dwarfism
 Cultural depictions of dwarfism
 The Bachelor (2002)
 There's Something About Miriam (2004)

References

2004 television specials
Fox Broadcasting Company original programming
Fox television specials
Television controversies in the United States